The Green Scarf is a 1954 British mystery film directed by George More O'Ferrall and starring Michael Redgrave, Ann Todd, Leo Genn, Kieron Moore, Richard O'Sullivan and Michael Medwin. The film's plot concerns a man who is accused of a seemingly motiveless murder. The film was shot at Shepperton Studios with sets designed by the art director Wilfred Shingleton. It was written by Gordon Wellesley based on the Guy des Cars novel The Brute.

Cast

 Michael Redgrave as Maitre Deliot 
 Ann Todd as Solange Vauthier 
 Leo Genn as Rodelec 
 Kieron Moore as Jacques 
 Richard O'Sullivan as Child Jacques 
 Jane Lamb as Child Solange 
 Michael Medwin as Teral 
 Jane Griffiths as Danielle 
 Ella Milne as Louise 
 Jane Henderson as Mme. Vauthier 
 George Merritt as Advocate General 
 Peter Burton as Purser
 Tristan Rawson as Prison Governor  
 Henry Caine as Ship's Captain
 Phil Brown as John Bell 
 Anthony Nicholls as Goirin 
 Walter Horsbrugh as Interpreter 
 Evelyn Roberts as President of the Court 
 Neil Wilson as Inspector 
 Michael Golden as Warder
 	Launce Maraschal as 	Sen. Bell
 Terence Alexander as Wireless Operator
 Frank Singuineau as 	Clerk at Telgram desk 
 Wilfrid Brambell as 	Court clerk

Critical reception
In The New York Times, its film critic Bosley Crowther concluded: "The Green Scarf is a mottled and unconvincing thing."

Box office
According to Kinematograph Weekly the film was a "money maker" at the British box office in 1954.

References

External links
The Green Scarf at the Internet Movie Database

1954 films
1950s mystery films
British mystery films
Films directed by George More O'Ferrall
British Lion Films films
Films shot at Shepperton Studios
Films based on French novels
1950s English-language films
British black-and-white films
1950s British films